Tiago Magalhães de Sá (born 11 January 1995) is a Portuguese professional footballer who plays for S.C. Braga as a goalkeeper.

Formed at Braga, where he was mainly a reserve and back-up, he made over 50 first-team appearances and won the Taça da Liga (2020) and Taça de Portugal (2021).

Club career
Born in Vila Verde, Braga District, Sá joined S.C. Braga's youth system at the age of 10. He spent his first five seasons as a senior with the reserves in the Segunda Liga, his first match in the competition being played on 11 August 2013 in a 1−2 home loss against C.D. Tondela. He was called up to the first team for a home game against Académica de Coimbra on 6 January 2016 due to injury to regular back-up Matheus, and remained unused as Stanislav Kritsyuk played in the 3–0 win.

Early into the 2018−19 campaign, Sá became the first team's first choice due to a serious knee injury contracted by the Brazilian. His Primeira Liga debut took place on 31 August, in a 1−0 away win over G.D. Chaves.

Sá was voted Braga's Newcomer of the Year in January 2019. Days later, he signed a new contract to tie himself to the club until 2023. He lost his place after Matheus returned to fitness.

Sá's one match as Braga won the Taça da Liga in 2019–20 was the final group game, a 4–1 win at F.C. Paços de Ferreira. He played their first three rounds as they conquered the Taça de Portugal in the following season.

International career
Sá earned 22 caps for Portugal from under-18 to under-20 level, between 2012 and 2015. He was part of the under-19 team that came runners-up at the 2014 UEFA European Championship; his only game was in the semi-final against reigning champions Serbia, coming on as a substitute for the injured André Moreira in the fourth minute of extra time, he saved from Sergej Milinković-Savić to win the penalty shootout.

Honours
Braga
Taça de Portugal: 2020–21
Taça da Liga: 2019–20

References

External links

1995 births
Living people
People from Vila Verde
Sportspeople from Braga District
Portuguese footballers
Association football goalkeepers
Primeira Liga players
Liga Portugal 2 players
S.C. Braga B players
S.C. Braga players
Portugal youth international footballers